Washington's 37th legislative district is one of forty-nine districts in Washington state for representation in the state legislature.

The district encompasses Beacon Hill, Central District, Rainier Valley, Columbia City, Rainier Beach, and Renton.

The district's legislators are state senator Rebecca Saldaña and state representatives Sharon Tomiko Santos (position 1) and Chipalo Street (position 2), all Democrats.

On December 12, 2016, Rebecca Saldaña was selected to fill Pramila Jayapal's seat in the senate over Rory O'Sullivan and Shasti Conrad following a special appointment by the King County Council. Jayapal had recommended Saldaña for her replacement, stating "Rebecca is a proven and effective leader – she has gotten results on some of the toughest issues our community faces. I strongly support her appointment to the State Senate."

See also
Charles Stokes
Michael Ross
Sam Smith
Washington Redistricting Commission
Washington State Legislature
Washington State Senate
Washington House of Representatives

References

External links
Washington State Redistricting Commission
Washington House of Representatives
Map of Legislative Districts

37